Prime Evil is an anthology of horror short stories edited by Douglas E. Winter.  It was first published in 1988 by New American Library.  With the exception of the Dennis Etchison story, "The Blood Kiss", the stories are original to this anthology.

Contents
 Introduction, by Douglas E. Winter
 "The Night Flier", by Stephen King
 "Having a Woman at Lunch", by Paul E. Hazel
 "The Blood Kiss", by Dennis Etchison
 "Coming to Grief", by Clive Barker
 "Food", by Thomas Tessier
 "The Great God Pan", by M. John Harrison
 "Orange Is for Anguish, Blue for Insanity", by David Morrell
 "The Juniper Tree", by Peter Straub
 "Spinning Tales with the Dead", by Charles L. Grant
 "Alice’s Last Adventure", by Thomas Ligotti
 "Next Time You’ll Know Me", by Ramsey Campbell
 "The Pool", by Whitley Strieber
 "By Reason of Darkness", by Jack Cady

Sources

1988 anthologies
Horror anthologies
New American Library books